Melissa Cerrato is a member of the Pennsylvania House of Representatives from the 151st district. She won her race in 2022 by 58 votes and was sworn in on January 3, 2023. Cerrato focused her campaign on reproductive rights, funding public schools, sensible gun legislation, affordable living, and government accountability.

Cerrato's win was pivotal in flipping the Pennsylvania House to the Democrats for the first time in 12 years.

References

Living people
Pennsylvania Democrats
Year of birth missing (living people)